Jorge João Zarif (born 30 September 1992 in São Paulo) is a Brazilian sailor, competing in the Finn class. Son of Brazilian Olympic sailor Jorge Zarif Neto, after finishing 20th at the 2012 Summer Olympics,  Zarif was world champion in both junior and senior levels, winning gold at the 2013 Youth Championship (his second title, after the 2009 edition) in Cyprus and the 2013 Finn Gold Cup in Estonia. His second Olympic appearance in 2016 had Zarif improve handily, with a fourth place.

He represented Brazil at the 2020 Summer Olympics.

References

External links
  (new website)
 
 

Brazilian male sailors (sport)
1992 births
Sportspeople from São Paulo
Living people
Olympic sailors of Brazil
Sailors at the 2012 Summer Olympics – Finn
Brazilian people of Arab descent
Sailors at the 2016 Summer Olympics – Finn
Finn class world champions
World champions in sailing for Brazil
Sailors at the 2020 Summer Olympics – Finn